"Get It Started" is a song by American recording artist Pitbull for his seventh studio album Global Warming. It was released on June 25, 2012 as the second single from the album by RCA Records. The song features guest vocals from Colombian singer-songwriter Shakira, marking the third time they have collaborated on a song together, the others being an official remix to the Spanish version of "Did it Again", "Lo Hecho Está Hecho", and the English version of "Rabiosa". The artists co-wrote the song with its producers, DJ Buddha, Sidney Samson, Marc Kinchen, Develop, with additional writing from Durrell "Tank" Babbs and Kris Stephens. It is a dance-pop song that "blends a dance beat and up-tempo verses with a slowed-down, piano-driven pop chorus".

Background and release

Pitbull and Shakira first collaborated with each other in 2010 from her seventh studio album Sale el Sol (2010), Shakira enlisted Pitbull to co-write the English and Spanish versions of the songs "Loca" and "Rabiosa". Pitbull appears on the English version of the latter.

In June 2011 Pitbull revealed that he had reached out to Shakira to appear on his single "Give Me Everything". Shakira declined his offer, citing personal issues, but stated that she would be open to a collaboration with him in the future, but "not now". Pitbull then sent the verse he offered to Shakira song to Ne-Yo, who recorded it and "knocks it out of the park". Pitbull then reached out to Shakira once again, stating that: "I think this is really going to be a monster, I would love for you to be a part of it, if not cool". She declined the second verse offered to her, and it went to Nayer.

On October 7, 2011 the RCA Music Group announced it was disbanding J Records along with Arista Records and Jive Records.  With the shutdown, Pitbull (and all other artists previously signed to these three labels) will release his future material on the RCA Records brand. Pitbull revealed in March 2012 that he and Shakira had recorded a new song together. He stated that the song was "a follow up to what we have going on with the 'Men in Black(III)'." He concluded by stating that: "I look forward to anything I have to do with Shakira". Shakira recorded her vocals for the song in Barcelona, while Pitbull recorded his in the Dominican Republic. The song was leaked online on June 25, 2012.

Pitbull performed this during the MDA Show of Strength on September 2, 2012, with video footage of Shakira in the background.

Composition

"Get It Started" is a dance-pop and Eurodance song with a duration of four minutes and five seconds. It was written by Pitbull, Bigram Zayas, Durrell Babbs, Kris Stephens, Marc Kinchen, Sidney Samson, Urales Vargas, and Shakira, and produced by DJ Buddha, Marc Kinchen, Develop and Sidney Samso. The song's composition "blends a dance beat and up-tempo verses with a slowed-down, piano-driven pop chorus", with "a pummeling synth instrumental to back the Latin-rap heavyweight’s high-energy verses." After each chorus, there is a eurodance beat.

Shakira provides the "heart-wrung hook" on "Get It Started", "emoting as the beat breaks off into a subtle stomp" before quickly "returning in full force seconds later". in the chorus, she sings: "Everytime I look into your eyes / I feel like I could stare in them for a lifetime / we can get started for life." On the song, Pitbull talks about "his passports and his world travels", singing: "To these rappers I apologize, I know it ain’t fair / Only ball I drop, New Year’s Times Square / The world is mine / Sixth sense, I see the seven signs / Now baby, let’s get started for life." He also names Tom Cruise on the lyrics, although in a way "that would have Cruise’s lawyers come knocking on his door", in reference to his past legal issues with Lindsay Lohan.

Music video
The music video was first released onto Pitbull's official VEVO channel on August 2, 2012 and was directed by David Rosseau. Shakira shot her part of the video in Barcelona, Spain, while Pitbull shot his part in Madrid, Spain. The music video has scenes that cut between the two and has them separately on top of a clock tower. After the line "don't start what you can't finish", it shows Pitbull driving very fast in traffic before the outro, where he is on stage performing the song. The video has received over 76 million views.

Formats and track listings
 Digital download
 "Get It Started" (feat. Shakira) – 4:05
 "Back in Time" (Play-n-Skillz Remix) - 3:38

CD single
 "Get It Started" (feat. Shakira) – 4:06
 "I Like (The Remix)" (feat. Enrique Iglesias and Afrojack) – 3:37

Credits and personnel

 Armando C. Perez – vocals, songwriter
 Durrell Babbs – songwriter
 Kris Stephens – songwriter
 Marc Kinchen – songwriter, record producer
 Sidney Samson – songwriter, record producer
 Urales "DJ Buddha" Vargas – songwriter, record producer
 Shakira – vocals, songwriter
 Develop – songwriter, record producer

Source:

Charts

Certifications

|-

Release history

References

External links
 

2012 singles
Pitbull (rapper) songs
Shakira songs
Eurodance songs
Song recordings produced by RedOne
RCA Records singles
Songs written by Marc Kinchen
Songs written by Pitbull (rapper)
Songs written by Shakira
2012 songs
Songs written by Tank (American singer)
Songs written by Kris Stephens
Songs written by DJ Buddha
Song recordings produced by DJ Buddha